The Albufera, La Albufera or L'Albufera de València (meaning "lagoon" in Valencian, from Arabic  al-buhayra, "small sea"), is a freshwater lagoon and estuary on the Gulf of Valencia coast of the Valencian Community in eastern Spain. The natural biodiversity of the nature reserve allows a great variety of flora and fauna to thrive and be observed year-round. Though once a saltwater lagoon, dilution due to irrigation and canals draining into the estuary and the sand bars increasing in size had converted it to freshwater by the seventeenth century.

Geography
Its proximity to the capital city of the Valencian Land and easy access facilitate nature experiences and birdwatching.

Since 1990, the Valencian Albufera Nature Reserve has been included as a Ramsar Site in the list of wetlands of international importance for birds, established in the Ramsar Convention of 1971. Since 1991 the Parc Natural de l'Albufera de València has also been included in the Special Protection Areas (Zepa in Spanish).

Fishing 

The most important human use of the lagoon has traditionally been and continues to be fishing.

History
From prehistoric times the rich fishing has attracted people specializing in this activity there. Fishing was legally recognised in year 1250, when regulations were laid down for the El Palmar Fishing Association (residents of the Valencia extramural parish of Russafa who settled permanently on the island of El Palmar to work more conveniently) and which would then be applied to the fisheries of Silla and Catarroja.

Present day
Until the lagoon's catchment area started to become industrialised, fishing generated substantial profits, as the clean waters of the lake provided a great diversity and abundance of fish ("gambeta", "petxinot", eels, bass, etc.).

At present, catches of bass and eels have dropped considerably, while those of mullet and American blue crab (a species introduced in the 1980s) have increased.

Agriculture 
Rice growing is another traditional use, though more recent (since the 18th century); it has big economic and environmental importance because plant and animal species that have disappeared from the lake itself still live in the rice fields (where the water of the lagoon is purified). These rice paddies also provide food and shelter for many birds.

Nevertheless, nowadays the amount of water that arrives to the lagoon is less than some years ago, and the quality of the water is worse. It needs a better management of its water, so it can be a good environment for the fish and plants that used to live there.

Microbes of the Albufera
L'Albufera is heavily dominated by Cyanobacteria, particularly Synechococcus. The natural microbial population of Albufera has been recently described.

See also

Index: Special Protection Areas of Spain
List of Ramsar sites in Spain

References

External links
Parc Natural de L'Albufera de València
English audio guide (40 Chapters, about two minutes each)

Coastal lagoons
Lagoons of Europe
Wetlands of Spain
Natural parks of Spain
Natural parks of the Valencian Community
Protected areas of the Valencian Community
Ramsar sites in Spain
Special Protection Areas of Spain
Geography of the Province of Valencia
Landforms of the Valencian Community
Estuaries of Europe
Geography of Valencia